Zaneylan may refer to:
 Zaneylan-e Olya
 Zaneylan-e Sofla

See also
Zeynalan (disambiguation)